United Nations Security Council Resolution 287, adopted unanimously on October 10, 1970, after examining the application of  Fiji for membership in the United Nations, the Council recommended to the General Assembly that Fiji be admitted.

See also
 List of United Nations Security Council Resolutions 201 to 300 (1965–1971)

References
Text of the Resolution at undocs.org

External links
 

 0287
Foreign relations of Fiji
History of Fiji
 0287
 0287
October 1970 events